Domingo Guzmán (born April 5, 1975) is a former Major League Baseball player.

He made his major league debut with the San Diego Padres in 1999, and played in 8 games from 1999 to 2000. He traveled to Taiwan, and played one season in the Chinese Professional Baseball League with the Chinatrust Whales. He was signed by the Yokohama BayStars in 2002, and marked 5 wins to become a part of the starting rotation. He was re-signed for the following season, but was inconsistent throughout the season, marking an 8–12 record with a 4.69 ERA. He was released at the end of 2003, despite leading the last-place BayStars in wins.

He was picked up by the Chunichi Dragons in 2004, and marked a respectable 10–5 record with a 3.76 ERA. He missed most of 2005 after sustaining a shoulder injury, and was demoted to the minors at the beginning of 2006. He was put on waivers in August, and was released shortly afterwards. He now plays for the Tohoku Rakuten Golden Eagles.

He set the world record for consecutive at-bat strikeouts with the BayStars, striking out 18 times in a row in 2003.

External links

1975 births
Living people
Arizona League Padres players
Chunichi Dragons players
Clinton LumberKings players
Dominican Republic expatriate baseball players in Japan
Dominican Republic expatriate baseball players in Taiwan
Dominican Republic expatriate baseball players in the United States
Idaho Falls Braves players
Las Vegas Stars (baseball) players

Kōchi Fighting Dogs players
Major League Baseball pitchers
Major League Baseball players from the Dominican Republic
Mobile BayBears players
Nippon Professional Baseball pitchers
Portland Beavers players
Rancho Cucamonga Quakes players
San Diego Padres players
Tohoku Rakuten Golden Eagles players
Yokohama BayStars players